Umarjon Sharipov (born 5 June 2000) is a Tajikistani professional football player who currently plays for Khatlon.

Career

International
Hanonov made his senior team debut on 3 September 2020 against Uzbekistan.

Career statistics

International

References

External links
 

2000 births
Living people
Tajikistani footballers
Tajikistan international footballers
CSKA Pamir Dushanbe players
FC Istiklol players
Association football midfielders